The Xinjiang Flying Tigers is a basketball team based in Ürümqi, Xinjiang, China. The team play its home games at the Hongshan Arena, which has a capacity for 3,800 spectators. The club joined the Chinese Basketball Association Division 2 in the 1999–2000 CBA season, advanced to Division 1A in the 2002–03 season, and had three consecutive Grand Finals appearances in the 2008–09, 2009–10 and 2010–11 seasons. The Flying Tigers won their first Championship in the 2016–17 CBA season, defeating Guangdong Southern Tigers 4–0 in the finals.

In 2023, the team withdrew from the Chinese Basketball Association.

History

The Xinjiang Flying Tigers joined the Chinese Basketball Association's Division 2 ahead of the 1999–2000 CBA season, as the first step in the league's plans to expand into the country's western interior. The Flying Tigers won their Division 2 season undefeated and advanced to the Division 1B. Two years later, the Flying Tigers won the 2001–02 season of Division 1B and advanced to Division 1A.

In their first Division 1A season, the Flying Tigers managed to advance to the playoffs, but lost to Beijing Ducks in a 3–1 quarter-final series. After this season, they qualified for the playoffs for another three consecutive seasons, but was never able to advance beyond the first round. In the 2007–08 season, the Flying Tigers signed the former NBA player Mengke Bateer, who brought the team to the second place in regular season. However, a Flying Tigers player, Sou Song Cun, also known as Guan Xiuchang, was found to have a foreign nationality but registered as a domestic player. The league punished the Flying Tigers by treating every game that Sou Song Cun played as a loss for the Flying Tigers. As a result, the Flying Tigers dropped to eleventh place, and missed the playoffs.

After the disappointing season, head coach Jiang Xingquan promoted several young players from the youth team to the first team, including Shirelijan Muxtar and Kyranbek Makhan, who would go on to become the most iconic players of the franchise. Together with Bateer and Jiang, they created the first golden era of the Xinjiang Flying Tigers. Bateer became the first player to win three consecutive CBA MVPs, and the team made it to three consecutive CBA Grand Finals. However, in each of the Grand Finals series, Xinjiang lost to the Guangdong Southern Tigers.

The Flying Tigers started its rebuild in the 2012–13 season. They reached the Grand Finals the next season with a relatively low-key roster, despite losing to Beijing Ducks 4–2. Before the 2014–15 season, Xinjiang signed Zhou Qi to build a team around him. Surrounding Zhou Qi, the Flying Tigers signed former NBA stars Andray Blatche and Jordan Crawford. However, Crawford left the team after a few games into the season for medical reasons and refused to return. Losing a key piece of the championship contending roster, the team struggled to find a replacement through the season and ended the season in ninth place, missing the playoffs. The next season, Xinjiang signed championship coach Li Qiuping and all-star forward Li Gen and lost to Sichuan Blue Whales 3–0 in the semi-finals.

In the 2016–17 season, the Flying Tigers signed Bulgarian guard Darius Adams. The star-filled roster of Andray Blatche, Darius Adams, Zhou Qi, Li Gen, Shirelijan Muxtar, and Kyranbek Makhan triumphed through the season, finishing in first place in the regular season. In the playoffs, Xinjiang defeated Shandong Kingston Lions 3–0 in the quarter-finals and Liaoning Flying Leopards 4–1 in the semi-finals. In the Grand Finals, the Flying Tigers defeated their long-time rival Guangdong Southern Tigers in a dominating 4–0 series to win the first ever championship in the franchise's history. Darius Adams won the FMVP award.

After winning the championship, Zhou Qi went to the NBA and joined the Houston Rockets. Losing the all-star center, Xinjiang finished the season with a 3–1 loss to Guangdong Southern Tigers in the quarter-finals. The next season, the team changed the head coach mid-season, signing another championship coach, the Xinjiang native Adiljan Suleyman. The team also changed the foreign players four times during the season, trying Al Jefferson, Nick Minnerath, Hamed Haddadi, and Darius Adams, and finally settled with Jarnell Stokes and Kay Felder at the start of the playoffs. The team reached the Grand Finals, where they lost to Guangdong Southern Tigers 4–0.

In March 2023, the Xinjiang Flying Tigers withdrew from the CBA in protest against a penalty that would have banned the club from signing new players for one year, following contract disputes between the club and Zhou Qi.

Players

Current roster

Season-by-season record

Honours

Continental competitions
FIBA Asia Champions Cup
Champions: 2016
Runners-up: 2017

Domestic competitions
Chinese Basketball Association
Playoffs Champions: 2016–17
Playoffs Runners-up (5): 2008–09, 2009–10, 2010–11, 2013–14, 2018–19
Regular Season Champions (2): 2010–11, 2016–17
Regular Season Runners-up (6): 2005–06 (North), 2008–09, 2009–10, 2013–14, 2015–16, 2019–20

Notes

References 
Specific

General
 
 

 
Sport in Ürümqi
Chinese Basketball Association teams
Basketball teams established in 1999
1999 establishments in China